Gatwick Airport Up sidings are located near London Gatwick Airport, Crawley, England, situated on the Brighton Main Line south of Gatwick Airport station. The sidings are accessed from the Up Platform Loop line.

Present 
All train operating companies whose trains operate on the Brighton Main Line can use the sidings. Those which can regularly be seen include: Class 387 and Class 442 EMUs.

References 

Railway sidings in England